Xylorycta molybdina is a moth in the family Xyloryctidae. It was described by Turner in 1898. It is found in Australia, where it has been recorded from Queensland.

The wingspan is 22–29 mm. The forewings are pale slate-colour with a white streak along the costal edge not reaching the apex. The hindwings are grey, paler towards the base.

The larvae feed on Melaleuca leucadendra. They bore in the stem of their host plant.

References

Xylorycta
Moths described in 1898